Freya Mavor (born 13 August 1993) is a Scottish actress and model. She is best known for her roles as Mini McGuinness in the E4 teen drama Skins and Daria Greenock in the HBO finance drama series Industry.

Early life
Mavor was born in Glasgow, but grew up in Inverleith, Edinburgh. Her father, James Mavor, is a playwright who leads the MA screenwriting course at Napier University. Her grandfather, named Ronald Bingo Mavor, was The Scotsman's theatre critic in the early 1960s before he became the director of the Scottish Arts Council. Her great-grandfather, James Bridie (real name Osborne Mavor), changed the Scottish theatrical landscape by setting up in 1950 a college of drama, the forerunner of the Royal Scottish Academy of Music and Drama. Mavor's mother is Irish and also has some Danish ancestry.

Mavor first became interested in acting after watching The Shining when she was ten years old. For a period, she lived in La Rochelle, France. She studied at Collège Eugène Fromentin in La Rochelle and at Mary Erskine School in Edinburgh, and has been a member of the National Youth Theatre since 2008. Her first acting experience was in school productions of Shakespeare's The Tempest as Miranda and in The Merchant of Venice, directed by John C. Allan, prior to a stint in the National Youth Theatre.

Career
In 2011, Mavor made her professional debut as Mini McGuinness in the fifth and sixth series of E4 drama Skins. She described her character as "quite a feisty and witty figure, but she doesn't really think about the consequences of her actions". For her role, she was nominated for Best Actress at the TV Choice Awards 2012.

Mavor became the face of Pringle of Scotland for its 2011 spring/summer campaign. She also won the Fashion Icon of the Year Award at the 2011 Scottish Fashion Awards.

In 2013, Mavor played Nicola Ball in the romantic comedy Not Another Happy Ending. It was first screened at the 2013 EIFF Closing Night. The film is about a writer suffering from writer's block and her publisher's campaign to get her writing again. In the same year, she appeared as Liz in Sunshine on Leith, an adaptation of the stage musical based on the lyrics of The Proclaimers, first screened at TIFF 2013. In 2015, she starred in Joann Sfar's French-Belgian mystery film The Lady in the Car with Glasses and a Gun alongside Benjamin Biolay and Italian actor Elio Germano. It was the first of a three consecutive French-speaking roles for Mavor, who speaks French fluently, followed in 2016 by supporting roles in both Yvan Attal's satire about antisemitism Ils sont partout and the period drama Cézanne et moi, about the friendship between novelist Émile Zola and painter Paul Cézanne and starring Guillaume Canet and Guillaume Gallienne in the two leading roles.

On television, Mavor portrayed Princess Elizabeth of York in the 2013 period drama The White Queen for BBC One. Later that year, she joined Will Merrick in stage production Boys at the Arcola Theatre in London. Mavor's next television role was in Channel 4 historical miniseries New Worlds, where she played Jamie Dornan's love interest in a 17th-century story set in England. In May 2014, she appeared in the episode "En apesanteur" ("At zero gravity") of the French TV show Casting(s) by Pierre Niney.

In 2017, Mavor had a supporting role in the mystery drama The Sense of an Ending, starring Jim Broadbent and Charlotte Rampling, then took a leading role in the romance film Modern Life Is Rubbish, which portrays the ups and downs throughout the years of a relationship between a man and a woman who share a passion for alternative rock. In 2018, she had a role in the black comedy Dead in a Week: Or Your Money Back, starring Aneurin Barnard and Tom Wilkinson. The same year she starred alongside John Malkovich in the BBC One miniseries The ABC Murders, based on the mystery novel by Agatha Christie; alongside David Kross in the biographical film The Keeper, about the life of German football player Bert Trautmann; and alongside Vincent Cassel and Olga Kurylenko in another French-language production, L'Empereur de Paris, about early 18th-century French criminalist Eugène François Vidocq, the man who's considered the first detective in history.

Mavor was also set to appear in the Netflix-produced Gore Vidal biopic titled Gore, which was indefinitely shelved following leading actor Kevin Spacey's sexual misconduct allegations.

Personal life
Mavor has two brothers, Hugo and Alex. She can play the piano, and also speaks French fluently. In 2005, she was a mezzo-soprano at the National Youth Choir of Scotland. She was voted 78th in the UK edition of FHM 100 World's Sexiest Women 2012. In 2013, Screen International named her as one of the UK Stars of Tomorrow.

Filmography

Feature films

Short films

Television

Stage

References

External links

 
 

1993 births
Living people
21st-century Scottish actresses
Actresses from Edinburgh
Actresses from Glasgow
National Youth Theatre members
People educated at the Mary Erskine School
People from La Rochelle
Scottish film actresses
Scottish stage actresses
Scottish television actresses
Scottish people of Danish descent
Scottish people of Irish descent